Douglas Arthur Joseph Latchford (15 October 1931 – 2 August 2020) was a British art dealer and smuggler.

Biography
Latchford was born on 15 October 1931 in Mumbai, India, which was at the time under the British Raj. He was educated at Brighton College in England before returning to India shortly before Independence.

Latchford initially worked in the pharmaceutical industry in Mumbai. He moved to Bangkok in 1956, and in 1963 established a drug distribution company. Latchford also invested profitably in Thailand land development and became a Thai citizen in 1968. He was briefly married to a Thai woman and took a Thai name, Pakpong Kriangsak.

A long-time devotee of the sport of bodybuilding, Latchford became a patron of the sport in Thailand and was the honorary president of the Thai Bodybuilding Association from 2016 until his death.

Antiquities trade

A controversial figure, Latchford was best known as a collector of Cambodian antiquities. According to his obituary in The New York Times, Latchford was "a cultured accumulator of museum-quality Khmer sculptures and jewels", whilst The Diplomat reported that, due to his leading position in the illegal antiquities trade of the Khmer Rouge, "no single figure looms as large over a nation’s wholesale pillage." Nonetheless, the Cambodian government awarded Latchford a Grand Cross of the Royal Order of Monisaraphon in 2008. He co-authored three books on Khmer antiquities with academic Emma Bunker.

In the 1970s, Latchford became one of the leading suppliers of Cambodian art, selling to museums and private collections in Europe and North America, including the Metropolitan. He kept the best pieces for himself and his personal collection is rumored to rival that of the National Museum of Cambodia. When his daughter inherited the collection and donated it in full to Cambodia, it contained 125 pieces and was valued at $50m. 

Latchford liked to see himself as saving works of art that had been abandoned and were at risk during Cambodia's turbulent civil wars, although this viewpoint was contrasted by academics who alleged that several of Latchford's antiquities lacked a clear provenance. Latchford denied any wrongdoing, and gathered his collection long before legislation barring Latchford's practice of buying directly from farmers and dealers in Thailand. He also insisted that if the antiquities were not removed from Cambodia, “they would likely have been shot up for target practice by the Khmer Rouge.” In November 2019, Latchford, by then comatose, was charged by prosecutors in New York with falsifying the provenance of Khmer works of art, but the case ended with his death.

In October 2021, a large investigation by media from the UK, USA, and Australia, working with the ICIJ, explored the prevalence of artworks that Latchford had traded to public museums and galleries. The media consortium focused on the books published by Latchford, sale records, museum records, and corporate documents from trust structures established by Latchford for inheritance purposes to identify 27 pieces linked to Latchford in prominent collections. It highlighted at least a dozen works of art linked to Latchford held by the Metropolitan Museum of Art, and another fifteen relics among the Denver Art Museum, the British Museum, Cleveland Museum of Art, and the National Gallery of Australia. 

The reporting also investigated donations and sales by collectors and dealers associated with Latchford, identifying works of art in, amongst others, the Brooklyn Museum, Asian Art Museum, National Gallery of Australia, and Art Gallery of NSW. Many of the museums and galleries responded to the journalists and provided statements in relation to the allegations, although none made any commitment to return works associated with Latchford. The National Gallery of Australia claimed that a piece tied to Latchford was the subject of a live investigation, whilst the Los Angeles County Museum of Art refused to engage with the journalists. 

In November 2021, after rising pressure from the United States federal government, the Denver Art Museum agreed to voluntarily repatriate four Cambodian antiquities in their possession, which included three Khmer sandstone sculptures dating back to the 7th and 12th centuries, respectively, and an Iron Age Dong Son bronze bell.

Repatriation of collection 
Two years before Latchford's death, his daughter Nawapan Kriangsak had initiated discussions to return the whole collection, valued at over $50m, to be exhibited at the National Museum of Cambodia as the Latchford Collection. The transfer of ownership was completed on 18 September 2020: however, progress in returning the collection stalled following the release of the Pandora Papers, which revealed that the family had attempted to avoid paying UK Inheritance Tax.

Selected publications
 Adoration and Glory: The Golden Age of Khmer Art (2003) 
 Khmer Gold Gifts for the Gods (2008) 
Khmer Bronzes: New Interpretations of the Past (2011)

References

Antiques dealers
British non-fiction writers
1930s births
2020 deaths
English smugglers
Members of the Royal Order of Monisaraphon